The 2016–17 Toledo Rockets men's basketball team represented the University of Toledo during the 2016–17 NCAA Division I men's basketball season. The Rockets, led by seventh-year head coach Tod Kowalczyk, played their home games at Savage Arena, as members of the West Division of the Mid-American Conference. They finished the season 17–17, 9–9 in MAC play to finish in third place in the West Division. As the No. 7 seed in the MAC tournament. they defeated Bowling Green in the first round to advance to the quarterfinals where they lost to Ohio. They received an invitation to the College Basketball Invitational where they lost in the first round to George Washington.

Previous season
The Rockets finished the 2015–16 season 17–15, 8–10 in MAC play to finish in fifth place in the West Division. They lost in the first round of the MAC tournament to Eastern Michigan.

Departures

Incoming Transfers

Recruiting class of 2016

Recruiting class of 2017

Roster

Schedule and results

|-
!colspan=9 style=| Exhibition

|-
!colspan=9 style=| Non-conference regular season

|-
!colspan=9 style=| MAC regular season

|-
!colspan=9 style=| MAC tournament

|-
!colspan=9 style=| College Basketball Invitational

See also
 2016–17 Toledo Rockets women's basketball team

References

Toledo
Toledo
Toledo Rockets men's basketball seasons